Circassians in Israel are Israelis who are ethnic Circassians. They are a branch of the Circassian diaspora, which was formed as a consequence of the 19th-century Circassian genocide that was carried out by the Russian Empire during the Russo-Circassian War; Circassians are a Northwest Caucasian ethnic group who natively speak the Circassian languages and originate from the historical country-region of Circassia in the North Caucasus. The majority of Circassians in Israel are Muslims.

Israeli Circassians largely adhere to the Sunni branch of Islam; they number about 4,000–5,000 and live primarily in two towns: Kfar Kama, and Rehaniya. They are descended from two Circassian diaspora groups who were settled in the Galilee by the Ottoman Empire in the 1870s.

Circassians are one of only two minority groups in Israel (alongside the Druze) from whom conscripts are drawn for compulsory military service in the Israel Defense Forces (IDF). However, the IDF restricts conscription for the Circassian and Druze communities to males only; this policy is in contrast to the one applied to Israel's Jewish majority, from which females are also drafted alongside males.

History

Ottoman era

Circassia was a Christian land for 1,000 years, but from the 16th century to the 19th century, they were Islamized under the influence of Crimean Tatars and Ottoman Turks. The Circassians arrived in the Middle East after they were expelled from their homeland in the northwestern Caucasus. The Circassians, who fought during the Russo-Circassian War in the mid-to-late 19th century against the Russian Empire which captured the northern Caucasus, were massacred and expelled by Czarist Russia from the Caucasus. The Ottoman Empire, which saw the Circassians as experienced fighters, absorbed them in their territory and settled them in sparsely populated areas, including the Galilee.

The Circassian exiles established Rehaniya (nine miles north of Safed) in 1878, and Kfar Kama (13 miles southwest of Tiberias) in 1876. After having been deported a second time, this time from the Balkans, by Russia, Ottoman authorities settled Circassians in areas of the Levant as a bulwark against the Bedouins and Druze, who had at times resisted Ottoman rule as well as any hint of Arab nationalism, while avoiding settling Circassians among the Maronites due to the international problems it could cause.

At first, the Circassian settlers faced many challenges. The Bedouin viewed them as "squatters" of their pastures and appropriators of their springs, as well as pro-Ottoman agents placed there to undermine their autonomy, and Arab nationalism as it emerged tended to regard Circassians with suspicion; Circassian culture occasionally clashed with Arab mores as well, with local Arabs looking with horror upon the public dancing of Circassian men and women mixed together in festivals. At the time, Ottoman rule of the area was light and there was no real government and no law enforcement, and in various areas of the wider Levant region armed conflict not infrequently broke out between Circassians and other local groups, especially Bedouin and Druze groups in Syria, occasionally with little or no Ottoman intervention; some of these feuds continued as late as the mid-20th century The Chechen community of Syria, which had arrived at the same time as the Circassians, were nearly wiped out by disease, war, and destruction by 1880. However in Northern Israel the Circassians prevailed and European travelers praised their "advanced agricultural methods" and skill in animal husbandry.

Throughout the time of the Ottoman Empire, Circassians kept to themselves and maintained their separate identity, even having their own courts, in which they would tolerate no outside influence, and various travelers noted that they never forgot their homeland, for which they continually yearned.

British Mandate
Circassians in Palestine maintained good relations with the Yishuv and later the Jewish community in Israel, in part due to the language shared with many of the First Aliyah immigrants from Russia who settled in the Galilee. Circassians and Jews also sympathized with each other's histories of exile. When conflict between Jews and Arabs began during the British Mandate, the Circassians most often took either neutral or pro-Jewish stances.

State of Israel 
The Circassians preferred to remain neutral in the 1948 Arab–Israeli War. At their community leaders' request, since 1958, all male Circassians must complete the mandatory military service in the Israel Defense Forces upon reaching the age of majority, while females do not. In this, they are equal to the Israeli Jews and the Israeli Druze populations living in the State of Israel proper (this excludes most of the Druze population living on the Golan Heights). The percentage of the army recruits among the Circassian community in Israel is particularly high. Many Circassians also serve in the Israel National Police, Israel Border Police, and the Israel Prison Service.

In 1976, the Circassian community won the right to maintain its own educational system separate from the Israeli government's Department of Arab Affairs. As a result, the community manages its own separate educational system, which ensures that its culture is passed down to the younger generations. In 2011, a bill was passed by the Knesset to allocate NIS 680 million to the development of education, tourism, and infrastructure in Circassian and Druze villages.

Demography
Israeli Circassians have adopted the practice of smaller families, with an average of two children per family, compared to the national rate of 3.73 children per family.

They speak both Adyghe and Hebrew, and many also speak Arabic and English, while cultivating their unique heritage and culture.

Circassian identity

Although Circassians are loyal to Israel, serve in the IDF, and have "prospered" as part of Israel, while preserving their language and culture, for many Israeli Circassians, their primary loyalty remains toward their scattered nation with, for some, a desire to "gather all the Circassians in the same place, whether it's autonomy, a republic within Russia, or a proper state". Influenced by the global movement of Circassian nationalism, some Israeli Circassians have returned to Russian-ruled Circassia despite the current political situation in the North Caucasus, much to the dismay of their Israeli Jewish neighbors who would rather they stay. Some Circassians who emigrated to Circassia have returned after becoming disillusioned with the low standard of living in the Circassian homeland, though some have stayed.

Socioeconomic position
In 2012, it was reported that 80% of the younger generation of Circassians in Israel had a post-secondary degree. Overall, in Israel, the percentage of adult citizens with a post-secondary degree is 49%.

In 2007, Circassian and Druze authorities in Israel launched a joint market initiative to invest in the growing tourism industry for bed-and-breakfast stays in Circassian and Druze villages, giving outsiders a chance to experience their cultures.

Circassians are regarded as being both "politically and ideologically" closer to Israeli society, although lately, "at the margins", there has been a renewed emphasis on their Islamic identity, which is thought to be due to Islamophobia coming from some sectors of Israeli society. According to Eleonore Merza: "while the Israeli Circassians are treated quite differently from the Palestinians, they are still ... often victims of discrimination". Shlomo Hasson writes that on the one hand, there are elements of equality, while on the other hand, there is exclusion, inequality, and prolonged discrimination". On the one hand, Circassians in Israel exercise their civil rights. "They are entitled to vote and be elected to the representative bodies of the state." However, on the other hand, he says, "there is inequality between Jews and the minorities. This inequality is expressed in discrimination in the allocation of resources for education, for local government, in unemployment and getting jobs, and especially in the civil service". In 2009, Circassian and Druze activists called on the government to cancel controversial land appropriations and to increase funding to the Circassian community. According to these activists, "Circassians receive less than Arab or Haredi-religious communities, despite "sixty years of loyalty". In response to the protests, Prime Minister Benjamin Netanyahu asked the Circassian and Druze communities for "patience", citing the global financial crisis that was occurring in 2009. In 2011, in response to the concerns that had been raised by the activists from the Circassian and Druze communities, the Israeli Knesset approved an allocation of NIS 680 million to aid the development of education, employment, housing, and tourism, as well as assistance for the needs of discharged Druze and Circassian soldiers, the bill having passed with the support of Likud, Shas, and Yisrael Beiteinu.

Geographic dispersion
The Circassian community of Israel is concentrated almost entirely in the villages of Kfar Kama (population c. 3,000) and Rehaniya (population c. 1,000). In contrast to Circassian communities in other Middle Eastern countries, which have lost much of their traditions, Israeli Circassians have carefully preserved their culture. More than 90% of Circassians return to their villages after completing their military service and studies. Despite the difficulty of finding marriage partners within a community of 4,000, Israeli Circassians mostly shun intermarriage. Although some Arabs moved to Kfar Kama, they quickly integrated into local society, and left no lasting cultural impression. Intermarriage is widely regarded as a taboo there. Rehaniya absorbed larger numbers of internally displaced Arab refugees during the 1948 war, and as a result, intermarriage with non-Circassians, while still avoided for the most part, became more acceptable there.

Most of the Circassians in Kfar Kama are Shapsughs, while those in Rehaniya are mostly Abzakhs.

Circassian families in Israel

 Abrag
 Ashmuz or Achmuzh or Achmiz
 Bat
 Batwash
 Bghana
 Blanghaps
 Choshha or Shoshha
 Gorkozh
 Hadish
 Hako or Hakho
 Hazal
 Kobla
 Lauz
 Libai or Labai
 Nago
 Napso
 Nash
 Natkho or Natcho
 Qal
 Qatizh
 Sagas or Shagash
 Shamsi
 Shogan
 Shaga
 Thawcho
 Zazi

Notable people
Bibras Natcho (born 1988), Israeli-Circassian footballer, who plays as a midfielder for Serbian Partizan and also serves as the captain of the Israel national team
Izhak Nash (born 1989), Israeli-Circassian footballer who plays in the Israeli Premier League
Nili Natkho (1982–2004), Israeli-Circassian basketball player who played for Maccabi Ra'anana and Elitzur Ramla

See also
 Circassian diaspora

References

 
Circassians
Ethnic groups in Israel

Ethnic minorities
Circassian diaspora
Israeli culture
Islam in Israel
Demographics of Israel
Ethnic groups in the Middle East